Thyella Kamari Football Club was a Greek football club based in Kamari, Cyclades, Greece.

History
Thyella Kamari was created in the late 60's in Kamari, Santorini and has officially existed since the early 70's.

A few years later, the Greek state grants land in order to use it for the construction of a football stadium, so our team acquires its own stadium.

Since then and for several years, he has been actively present in the football categories of the Cyclades, noting significant distinctions.

In 2009 our team goes through the modern era since after a long period of abstinence from the EPSK championships, it is reactivated as in the same year its physical headquarters will be the first stadium on the island which will have an artificial turf.

The highlight of the modern history of our team is its emergence as a double Cyclades for the first time in its history in the 2017-18 season.

In the same year, our team celebrated its rise in the Gamma Ethniki and its participation in the groups of the Greek Cup, writing in golden letters its name in the history of Cycladic football since it is the first team from our prefecture to do so.

The sign of Thyella Kamari depicted the island of Santorini with white color in a combination of red and blue colors that are the main colors of our team.

Thyella Kamari season 2019-20 participated in the Championship of the Gamma Ethniki and in the Greek Cup as well as in the age championships K18, K16, K14 and K12.

The team was playing in its physical headquarters, which was the Kamari Municipal Stadium.

Honours

Domestic

 Cyclades FCA champion: 1
 2017–18
 Cyclades FCA Cup Winners: 1
 2017–18

References

Football clubs in South Aegean
Thira (regional unit)
Association football clubs established in 1970
1970 establishments in Greece
Gamma Ethniki clubs
Defunct football clubs in Greece